= The Bookman's Manual =

Reference work

The Bookman's Manual is an annotated reference guide to English-language literature. Following Bessie Graham's retirement as editor, the volume became The Reader's Adviser, edited by Hester Hoffman.
